Fina Miralles Nobell (born 27 September 1950 in Sabadell) is a Catalan artist who has worked with all types of media moving from conceptual art.

Art career 

She studied at the Faculty of Fine Arts at the University of Barcelona. She has had an extensive career within the national and international cultural: she directed the Sala Vinçon Barcelona, Sabadell Chamber Three, among others. From 1983, she left the world of professional art and travels to Latin America and France. Settled permanently in Cadaqués in 1999, after twenty-five years of pilgrimage.

Exhibitions, a selection 

1972 Sensitiveland. First solo exhibition. 

1980 Les mides del marc. Muntatge. Espai b5-125 of the Art Department of the Autonomous University of Barcelona.

1978 Mediterrània t’estim. Muntatge. XXXVIII Venice Biennale.

1981 Terra. Muntatge. Acadèmia de Belles Arts de Sabadell.

1982 En l’aire. Muntatge. Metrònom, Barcelona.

1996 Memorial. Sobre el tema de la rosassa de les catedrals gòtiques. Oli sobre tela de gran format. Sabadell

2016 Reposició de Naturaleses Naturals, Sala Vinçon, Barcelona, and at MAN National Archaeological Museum, Madrid.

2021 Fina Miralles: I Am All the Selves that I Have Been, at MACBA.

Awards

 2018 - National Culture Award of Catalonia.

References

External links
 

Artists from Catalonia
People from Sabadell
1950 births
Living people
University of Barcelona alumni
Spanish contemporary artists
Women artists from Catalonia